Thomas James Hockenson (born July 3, 1997) is an American football tight end for the Minnesota Vikings of the National Football League (NFL). He was drafted in the first round (eighth selection overall) of the 2019 NFL Draft by the Detroit Lions. He played college football at Iowa. As a redshirt sophomore in 2018, he was awarded the John Mackey Award as the nation's top tight end in college football.

Early years
Hockenson grew up in Cherokee, Iowa, moving back to Chariton, Iowa in his teenage years where he attended Chariton High School and played football and basketball. He was a four-year letter winner as a tight end and defensive back, and set school records for receiving yards in a game, season, and career. He led his team to the state playoffs as a senior and was named all-state first team that year. Hockenson was rated as a three-star recruit and the seventh-highest rated recruit in the state of Iowa in the class of 2016 by the 247Sports.com Composite, which aggregates the ratings of the major football recruiting services. He committed to the Iowa Hawkeyes on June 20, 2015.

College career
Hockenson redshirted his true freshman year in 2016. He was one of two tight ends in the starting lineup in Iowa's 2017 opener against Wyoming, along with Noah Fant. He recorded his first career receptions the next week against Iowa State, finishing with two catches for 41 yards in the game. He had his best game of the year in Iowa's upset victory over then-No. 3 Ohio State, where he led the team with five receptions for 71 yards and two touchdowns. Hockenson ultimately finished fifth on the team on the year with 24 receptions for 320 yards and three receiving touchdowns.

Hockenson was listed on the preseason watch list for the John Mackey Award going into the 2018 season, as was teammate Noah Fant. In an early season loss to rival Wisconsin, Hockenson set a career high with 125 receiving yards, including a 46-yard connection from quarterback Nate Stanley. He again eclipsed the 100-yard mark in an October 13 game against Indiana, where he recorded four receptions for 107 yards and two touchdowns. He ultimately finished the season with 46 receptions for 717 yards and six receiving touchdowns, leading the Hawkeyes in the first two categories and finishing one receiving touchdown behind Fant for the team lead. He was named first-team All-Big Ten at tight end by the media voters, and second-team behind Fant by the coaches. He also won the Big Ten's tight end of the year award, the Kwalick–Clark Award. Hockenson was awarded the John Mackey Award, honoring him as the top tight end in college football in 2018. He is the second Hawkeye to receive the award, after Dallas Clark in 2002, and the first sophomore.

On January 14, 2019, Hockenson announced via Twitter that he would be leaving school early to declare for the 2019 NFL Draft.

Statistics

Professional career

Detroit Lions

2019
Hockenson was drafted by the Detroit Lions in the first round as the eighth overall pick in the 2019 NFL Draft. On May 9, 2019, Hockenson signed a four-year deal with the Lions worth $19.8 million.

Hockenson played his first regular season game on September 8, 2019 against the Arizona Cardinals. He finished the game with six receptions for 131 receiving yards and a touchdown as the game ended in a 27–27 tie. Hockenson's 131 yards were the most in a debut for a tight end in NFL history. In Week 4 against the Kansas City Chiefs, Hockenson caught three passes for 27 yards and a touchdown before exiting the game with a concussion.  Without Hockenson, the Lions lost 34–30. He was placed on injured reserve on December 2, 2019. He finished the season with 32 receptions for 367 yards and two touchdowns.

2020
Hockenson was placed on the reserve/COVID-19 list by the Lions on July 29, 2020, and was activated 10 days later.

Hockenson made his return from injury in Week 1 against the Chicago Bears.  During the game, Hockenson caught five passes for 56 yards and his first receiving touchdown of the season as the Lions lost 27–23. On October 25, in a Week 7 matchup against the Atlanta Falcons, Hockenson caught the game-winning touchdown pass from Matthew Stafford as time expired, giving the Lions their third victory of the season. On December 21, 2020, he was named to the 2021 Pro Bowl.

2021
Hockenson entered the 2021 season as the Lions starting tight end. He was placed on injured reserve on December 17, 2021 after undergoing thumb surgery. He finished the season with 61 catches for 583 yards and four touchdowns through 12 games.

2022
The Detroit Lions picked up the fifth-year option on Hockenson's contract on April 26, 2022. In the Week 4  game against the Seattle Seahawks, Hockenson set the all-time Lions record for receiving yards in a game by a tight end, gaining 179 yards on eight receptions in the 48–45 loss. This broke the record of 161 yards set by Jim Gibbons on December 13, 1964.

Minnesota Vikings
On November 1, 2022, the Lions traded Hockenson along with a 2023 fourth-round draft pick and a conditional 2024 fourth-round draft pick to the Minnesota Vikings in exchange for a 2023 second-round pick and a 2024 third-round draft pick.

NFL career statistics

References

External links
Detroit Lions bio
Iowa Hawkeyes bio

1997 births
Living people
American football tight ends
Detroit Lions players
Iowa Hawkeyes football players
People from Chariton, Iowa
Players of American football from Iowa
National Conference Pro Bowl players
Minnesota Vikings players